The following table lists the average winter temperature in the 25 largest
cities in Russia. Population and rank are from the All-Russian census of 2002.
Average winter temperatures are from the references cited on each line.

Table

References

Temp
Climate of Russia